Tsakhur may refer to:

Tsakhur people
Tsakhur language
Tsakhur (village), village in Dagestan, Russia